This is a list of the presidents of the Geological Society of London.

List of presidents 

 1807–1813 George Bellas Greenough
 1813–1815 Henry Grey Bennet
 1815–1816 William Blake
 1816–1818 John MacCulloch
 1818–1820 George Bellas Greenough
 1820–1822 Spencer Compton, Earl Compton
 1822–1824 William Babington
 1824–1826 William Buckland
 1826–1827 John Bostock
 1827–1829 William Henry Fitton
 1829–1831 Adam Sedgwick
 1831–1833 Roderick Impey Murchison
 1833–1835 George Bellas Greenough
 1835–1837 Charles Lyell
 1837–1839 William Whewell
 1839–1841 William Buckland
 1841–1843 Roderick Impey Murchison
 1843–1845 Henry Warburton
 1845–1847 Leonard Horner
 1847–1849 Henry Thomas De la Beche
 1849–1851 Charles Lyell
 1851–1853 William Hopkins
 1853–1854 Edward Forbes
 1854–1856 William Hamilton
 1856–1856 Daniel Sharpe
 1856–1858 Joseph Ellison Portlock
 1858–1860 John Phillips
 1860–1862 Leonard Horner
 1862–1864 Andrew Crombie Ramsay
 1864–1866 William Hamilton
 1866–1868 Warington Wilkinson Smyth
 1868–1870 Thomas Henry Huxley
 1870–1872 Joseph Prestwich
 1872–1874 George Campbell, 8th Duke of Argyll
 1874–1876 John Evans
 1876–1878 Peter Martin Duncan
 1878–1880 Henry Clifton Sorby
 1880–1882 Robert Etheridge
 1882–1884 John Whitaker Hulke
 1884–1886 Thomas George Bonney
 1886–1888 John Wesley Judd
 1888–1890 William Thomas Blanford
 1890–1892 Archibald Geikie
 1892–1894 Wilfred Hudleston Hudleston
 1894–1896 Henry Woodward
 1896–1898 Henry Hicks
 1898–1900 William Whitaker
 1900–1902 Jethro Justinian Harris Teall
 1902–1904 Charles Lapworth
 1904–1906 John Edward Marr
 1906–1908 Archibald Geikie
 1908–1910 William Johnson Sollas
 1910–1912 William Whitehead Watts
 1912–1914 Aubrey Strahan
 1914–1916 Arthur Smith Woodward
 1916–1918 Alfred Harker
 1918–1920 George William Lamplugh
 1920–1922 Richard Dixon Oldham
 1922–1924 Albert Seward
 1924–1926 John William Evans
 1926–1928 Francis Arthur Bather
 1928–1930 John Walter Gregory
 1930–1932 Edmund Johnston Garwood
 1932–1934 Thomas Henry Holland
 1934–1936 John Frederick Norman Green
 1936–1938 Owen Thomas Jones
 1938–1940 Henry Hurd Swinnerton
 1940–1941 Percy George Hamnall Boswell
 1941–1943 Herbert Leader Hawkins
 1943–1945 William George Fearnsides
 1945–1947 Arthur Elijah Trueman
 1947–1949 Herbert Harold Read
 1949–1950 Cecil Edgar Tilley
 1950–1951 Owen Thomas Jones
 1951–1953 George Martin Lees
 1953–1955 William Bernard Robinson King
 1955–1956 Walter Campbell Smith
 1956–1958 Leonard Hawkes
 1958–1960 Cyril James Stubblefield
 1960–1962 Sydney Ewart Hollingworth
 1962–1964 Oliver Meredith Boone Bulman
 1964–1966 Frederick William Shotton
 1966–1968 Kingsley Charles Dunham
 1968–1970 Neville George
 1970–1972 William Alexander Deer
 1972–1974 Thomas Stanley Westoll
 1974–1976 Percy Edward Kent
 1976–1978 Wallace Spencer Pitcher
 1978–1980 Percival Allen
 1980–1982 Edward Howel Francis
 1982–1984 Janet Vida Watson
 1984–1986 Charles Hepworth Holland
 1986–1988 Bernard Elgey Leake
 1988–1990 Derek John Blundell
 1990–1992 Anthony Leonard Harris
 1992–1994 Charles David Curtis
 1994–1996 (Robert) Stephen (John) Sparks
 1996–1998 Richard Hardman
 1998–2000 Robin Cocks
 2000–2002 Ronald Oxburgh, Baron Oxburgh
 2002–2004 Mark Moody-Stuart
 2004–2006 Peter Styles
 2006–2008 Richard Fortey
 2008–2010 Lynne Frostick
 2010–2012 (Julian Patrick) Bryan Lovell
 2012–2014 David Thomas Shilston
 2014–2016 David Andrew Charles Manning
 2016–2018 Malcolm Brown
 2018–2020 Nick Rogers
 2020–2022 Michael Daly

See also 
 List of geologists

References

British geologists
Lists of scientists by membership

London-related lists